Ravand-e Sofla (also Romanized as Ravand-e Soflá; also known as Ravand-e Pā’īn) is a village in Beradust Rural District, Sumay-ye Beradust District, Urmia County, West Azerbaijan Province, Iran. At the 2006 census, its population was 111, in 21 families.

References 

Populated places in Urmia County